Craters of the Moon may refer to:

 Lunar craters, craters on the Earth's Moon
 Craters of the Moon National Monument and Preserve, a volcanic preserve in Idaho
 Craters of the Moon (geothermal site), in New Zealand